Brigden is a community in the township of St. Clair, Lambton County, Ontario, Canada. Brigden has a population of about 500 and is the centre of a thriving agricultural district.

The community is situated on the former Michigan Central Railroad line and thus is named after William Wharton Brigden, one of the engineers who surveyed the railway in 1936. Brigden died of a heart attack on May 26, 1939 in Battle Creek, Michigan, where he was the superintendent of the city waterworks.

Brigden was a Police village governed by a Village Chairman and a Board of Trustees.

The annual Brigden Fair is the last fair of the season in Lambton County occurring on Canadian Thanksgiving long weekend. Other annual events include the Brigden Community Fest.

It is also the birthplace of businessman JR Shaw, founder and executive chairman of Shaw Communications.

Notes

External links

Communities in Lambton County